Houda Rihani (born April 28, 1975 in Casablanca) is a Moroccan actress. She started off her career with performances in theatre, before moving on to television roles and eventually to cinema. She is currently based in Montreal, but continues to star in Moroccan television shows and films. She has won multiple national awards for her performances.

Partial filmography 
 1999 : Elle est diabétique, hypertendue et elle refuse de crever
 2003 : Khahit errouh
 2003 : Rahma
 2003 : Face à face
 2007 : The Bitter Orange
 2011 : N8ar Tzad Tfa Dow 2011 : Ayadin Khachina 2015 : Aïda''

References

External links 
 

20th-century Moroccan actresses
21st-century Moroccan actresses
1975 births
Living people